Mickey or Mick McGuire may refer to:

Mickey McGuire (baseball) (born 1941), American second baseman/shortstop
Mickey McGuire (ice hockey) (1898–1968), Canadian ice hockey forward
Mickey Rooney (1920–2014), who worked under this name for a while
Mickey McGuire (film series), two-reel shorts for strip Toonerville Folks
Mick McGuire (born 1952), title character of traditional Irish folk song

See also
Michael McGuire (disambiguation)
McGuire (surname)